Monfreid may refer to:

George-Daniel de Monfreid (1856–1929), French painter and art collector
Henry de Monfreid (1879–1974), French adventurer and author

See also
Manfreid
Manfred